The Hospital Bazán is a historical building in Marbella, Andalucia, Spain. Today it houses the Museum of Contemporary Spanish Engravings or "Museo del Grabado Español Contemporáneo".

History
This hospital was built in the first half of the 16th century. It was built in two stages, and in different architectural styles. Part of the building is in the Mudéjar style of architecture typical of late medieval Spain.

The facility was built with a donation left for this purpose in the Will of Don Alfonso de Bazán, who had spent his life in the city. The Will instructed that a hospital was to be built for the poor of the neighborhood. Bazán left his two adjoining houses to be used for this purpose, under the name of "Our Lady of the Incarnation". In addition to the hospital wards, there was a chapel in the complex which also served as the burial crypt for the Bazán family.

The donor set up a Board of Directors to supervise the running of the hospital, which task they carried out until the early 20th century. He also entrusted its pastoral care to the Trinitarian friars who had a monastery adjacent to the building, which has now disappeared.

The hospital has been designated as an Andalucian Historical Monument.

References

Hospital buildings completed in the 16th century
Hospitals established in the 16th century
Hospitals in Andalusia
Museums in Andalusia
Mudéjar architecture in Andalusia
16th-century establishments in Spain
Buildings and structures in Marbella
Historical Patrimony of Spain
Art museums and galleries in Spain